Antal Jancsó (28 October 1934 – 3 March 2023) was a Hungarian tennis player.

Jancsó's ancestors were originally from Transylvania.

Active on tour in the 1950s, Jancsó participated in Hungary's 1953 and 1954 Davis Cup campaigns. He won the Hungarian national doubles championship in 1956 with József Asbóth. In 1957, before the tiebreak was introduced, he played the longest ever French Championship match on record, losing a 83-game five set match to Bob Mark. He made the singles round of 16 at the 1958 French Championships, beating Bobby Wilson and Naresh Kumar en route. At the 1958 Italian Championships he partnered with Kurt Nielsen to win the doubles title.

See also
List of Hungary Davis Cup team representatives

References

External links
 
 
 

1934 births
2023 deaths
Hungarian male tennis players